The Rough Guide To The Music Of Afghanistan is a world music compilation album originally released in 2010. Part of the World Music Network Rough Guides series, the release covers a wide breadth of the music of Afghanistan on Disc One, and contains a "bonus" Disc Two highlighting the Ahmad Sham Sufi Qawwali Group. The album was compiled by Simon Broughton, editor of world music magazine Songlines, who also compiled The Rough Guide to the Music of Central Asia.

Critical reception

Jill Turner of GondwanaSound Radio rated it amongst the best compilation albums of the year. Chris Nickson of AllMusic praised the variety of the recording, while Deanne Sole of PopMatters wrote that Broughton's choice to select a wide range of styles meant that the listener would not hear the absolute best of Afghan music, but that the album gives an "opportunity to listen to the country through a kind of panopticon, ears out in 15 different directions."

Track listing

Disc One

Disc Two
All tracks on Disc Two are performed by the Ahmad Sham Sufi Qawwali Group.

References

External links

2010 compilation albums
World Music Network Rough Guide albums
Afghan music